Chengde Puning Airport  is an airport serving the city of Chengde in Hebei Province, North China. Construction began on March 25, 2011 at an estimated cost of 1.5 billion yuan. The airport was opened on May 31, 2017.

Airlines and destinations

See also
List of airports in China
List of the busiest airports in China

References

Airports in Hebei
Airports established in 2017
Chengde
2017 establishments in China